Sergelen may refer to:

People
 Sergelen Otgonbaatar (born 1989), Mongolian basketball player

Places
It is the name of two sums (districts) in Mongolia:

 Sergelen, Dornod
 Sergelen, Töv